XWP may stand for:

 Xena: Warrior Princess, an American television series filmed in New Zealand
 XWP, a filename extension for Crosstalk
 XWP, a filename extension for Xerox Writer